The International Syrian Tour,  is a men's stage cycle race which takes place in Syria and is rated by the UCI as 2.2 since 2022. It is part of the UCI Asia Tour. Professional road cycling competitions were resumed in Syria after eleven-years hiatus.

The first edition was in 2022, from 4 October to 8 October, and lasted for four days. The tour routes commences from Qardaha and it passes through Tartus and Jableh, and then it finishes at Latakia.

Winners

Wins per country

References

UCI Asia Tour races
Cycle racing in Syria